People's Liberation Party-Front of Turkey/Revolutionary Coordination Union (or THKP-C/DKB) was a short-lived revolutionary Marxist-Leninist organization in Turkey. The party was formed in the end of 1979, following a split from the People's Liberation Party-Front of Turkey/Revolutionary Action.

See also
 List of illegal political parties in Turkey
 Revolutionary People's Liberation Party/Front

Defunct communist parties in Turkey
Political parties established in 1979